Columbus, Ohio has numerous municipal parks, several regional parks (part of the Metro Parks system), and privately-owned parks. The Columbus Recreation and Parks Department operates 370 parks, with a combined .

City parks 

 Academy Park
 Albany Crossing Park
 Alexander AEP Park
 Alkire Woods Park
 Alum Crest Park
 Amvet Village Park
 Anheuser Busch Sports Park
 Antrim Park
 Argus Park
 Audubon Park
 Avalon Park
 Barnett Park
 Battelle Riverfront Park
 Beatty Park
 Beechcroft Park
 Beechwold Park
 Berliner Sports Park
 Berwick Park
 Bicentennial Park
 Big Run Park
 Big Walnut Park
 Blackburn Park
 Brandywine Park
 Brentnell Park
 Brevoort Park
 Brookside Woods Park
 Canini Park
 Carriage Place Park
 Cassady Park
 Casto Park
 Cedar Run Park
 Chaseland Park
 Cherry Bottom Park (South)
 City Gate Park
 Clinton-Como Park
 Clintonville Park
 Cody Park
 Columbus Commons (privately owned)
 Conner Park
 Cooke Park
 Cooper Park
 Crawford Farms Park
 Cremeans Park
 Deshler Park
 Devonshire Park
 Dexter Falls Park
 Dodge Park
 Dodge Skate Park
 Dorrian Commons Park (privately owned)
 Dorrian Green
 Driving Park
 Duranceau Park
 Easthaven Park
 Elk Run Park
 English Park
 Fairwood Park
 Flint Park
 Forest Park East Park
 Frank Fetch Memorial Park
 Franklin Park
 Franks Park
 Freedom Park
 Galloway Ridge Park
 Genoa Park
 Georgian Heights Park
 Glen Echo Park
 Glenview Park
 Glenwood Park
 Glick Park (O'shaughnessy Dam Overlook)
 Godown Road Park
 Goodale Park
 Granville Park
 Greene Countrie Park
 Griggs Reservoir Park
 Hamilton And Spring Portal Park
 Hanford Village Park
 Hard Road Park
 Harrison Park
 Harrison Smith Park
 Harrison West Park
 Hauntz Park
 Hayden Falls Park
 Hayden Park
 Haydens Crossing Park
 Heer Park
 Hellbranch Park
 Helsel Park
 Highbluffs Park
 Hilliard Green Park
 Hilltonia Park
 Holton Park
 Hoover Reservoir Park
 Huy Road Park
 Independence Village Park
 Indian Mound Park
 Indianola Park
 Innis Park
 Italian Village Park
 Iuka Park
 Jefferson Woods Park
 Jeffrey Scioto Park
 Joan Park
 Karns Park
 Keller Park
 Kelley Park
 Kenlawn Park
 Kenney Park
 Kingsrowe Park
 Kirkwood Park
 Kobacker Park
 Kraner Park
 Krumm Park
 Lazelle Woods Park
 Lehman Estates Park
 Lincoln Park
 Lindbergh Park
 Linden Park
 Linwood Park
 Liv Moor Park
 Livingston Park
 Lower Scioto Park
 Madison Mills Park
 Maloney Park
 Marie Moreland Park
 Marion Franklin Park
 Martin Luther King Park
 Martin Park
 Maybury Park
 Mayme Moore Park
 Maynard & Summit Park
 Mccoy Park
 McFerson Commons
 Mckinley Park
 Mifflin Park
 Millbrook Park
 Milo Grogan Park
 Mock Park
 Moeller Park
 Nafzger Park
 Nelson Park
 New Beginnings Park
 Noe Bixby Park
 North Bank Park
 North East Park
 Northcrest Park
 Northern Woods Park
 Northgate Park
 Northmoor Park
 Northtowne Park
 O' Shaughnessy Reservoir Park
 Ohio Police and Fire Memorial Park (privately owned)
 Olde Sawmill Park
 Overbrook Ravine Park
 Palsgrove Park
 Park of Roses (Whetstone Park)
 Parkridge Park
 Pingue Park
 Polaris Founder's Park
 Portman Park
 Prestwick Commons Park
 Pride Park
 Pump House Park
 Pumphrey Park
 Redick Park
 Remembrance Park (privately owned)
 Reynolds Crossing Park
 Rhodes Park

 Rickenbacker Park
 Riverbend Park
 Riverside Green Park
 Riverway Kiwanis Park
 Roosevelt Park
 Sader Park
 Sancus Park
 Saunders Park
 Sawyer Park
 Schiller Park
 Scioto Audubon Metro Park
 Scioto Greenlawn Dam Park
 Scioto Trail Park
 Scioto Woods Park
 Sensenbrenner Park
 Shady Lane Park
 Sharon Meadows Park
 Shrum Mound (owned by the Ohio History Connection)
 Shepard Park
 Side By Side Park
 Sills Park
 Smith Road Park
 South Side Settlement Heritage Park
 Southeast Lions Park
 Southgate Park
 Southwood Mileusnich Park
 Spindler Road Park
 Stephen Drive Park
 Stockbridge Park
 Stoneridge Park
 Strawberry Farms Park
 Summitview Park
 Sycamore Hills Park
 Tanager Woods Park
 The Promenade (Scioto Mile)
 Thompson Park
 Three Creeks Park
 Thurber Park
 Old Deaf School Park (Topiary Park)
 Trabue Woods Park
 Tuttle Park
 Walden Park
 Walnut Hill Park
 Walnut View Park
 Waltham Woods Park
 Washington Gladden Social Justice Park
 Webster Park
 Weinland Park
 Westchester Park
 Westgate Park
 Westmoor Park
 Wexford Green Park
 Wheeler Memorial Park
 Whetstone Park
 Williams Creek Park
 Willis Park
 Willow Creek Park
 Wilson Avenue Park
 Wilson Road Park
 Winchester Meadows Park
 Winding Creek Park
 Windsor Park
 Wolfe Park
 Woodbridge Green Park
 Woodward Park
 Worthington Hills Park
 Wrexham Park
 Wynstone Park

See also
 Metro Parks (Columbus metropolitan area)

References

External links

 List of city-owned parks

Columbus, Ohio
Parks in Columbus, Ohio